Cadence Bank Arena, formerly Tupelo Coliseum, BancorpSouth Center and BancorpSouth Arena is a 10,000-seat multi-purpose arena, near downtown Tupelo, Mississippi, named for the locally based Cadence Bank, a large multi-state commercial banking company.

It was the home of the Tupelo FireAnts and Mississippi MudCats arena football and the Tupelo T-Rex ice hockey teams.  It was also the home of the Mississippi Hound Dogs of the Ultimate Indoor Football League.

The $16 million,  facility was built in 1993, and is one of the more modern arenas, serving a small market in the mid-south. Its lot was previously occupied by a shopping mall called Downtown Mall. When the mall closed in 1990 the arena was retrofitted from the old building.

The arena also seats 8,000 for sports events, ranging from basketball to rodeos.

Notable events

Sports
WCW Uncensored (1995)
WCW Uncensored (1996),
WCW Spring Stampede (1997),
Gulf South Conference Basketball Tournament (2001-2005)

The arena has also hosted the Harlem Globetrotters on several occasions.  One Memphis Pharaohs (Arena Football League) home game was held there in 1996.

Concerts
Elton John
Backstreet Boys 
Journey
Toby Keith
Brad Paisley
Florida Georgia Line
Kenny Chesney
Aerosmith
Tim McGraw
Faith Hill
Miranda Lambert
Chris Young
Lynyrd Skynyrd
Miranda Lambert
Rae Sremmurd
Dwight Yoakum
Reba McEntire
Carrie Underwood
The arena can be scaled down to 4,500 for theater-style concerts. The arena is also used for trade shows and conventions of exhibit space plus  of meeting space).

On November 14, 2008, the arena hosted the Mississippi State Bulldogs club hockey team in a game against the Loyola University New Orleans club in the arena's first venture into ice hockey since the T-Rex left in 2003.

On November 21, 2010, the BancorpSouth Arena hosted a college basketball game featuring the Memphis Tigers and the LSU Tigers.

References

External links
BancorpSouth Arena

Indoor ice hockey venues in the United States
Basketball venues in Mississippi
Convention centers in Mississippi
Buildings and structures in Tupelo, Mississippi
Tourist attractions in Lee County, Mississippi
Indoor arenas in Mississippi
Sports in Tupelo, Mississippi
Sports venues completed in 1993
1993 establishments in Mississippi